The Challenge: USA is a spin-off of the long running reality television series The Challenge. It premiered on CBS on July 6, 2022.

Background 
The Challenge: USA features cast members from CBS' reality shows: Big Brother, Love Island, Survivor, and The Amazing Race.

In February 2022, a new series of international seasons was announced to air later in the year. The series is expected to comprise four new editions of The Challenge which includes The Challenge: USA followed by The Challenge: Australia, The Challenge Argentina: El Desafío and The Challenge UK. These local renditions are expected to be followed by a fifth series in which winners and select contestants of each series will compete again in Cape Town, South Africa on another season titled The Challenge: World Championship, which is also expected to air on Paramount+.

Contestants

{|
|valign="top"|

|valign="top"|
{|class="wikitable sortable" style="font-size:100%; white-space:nowrap"
!Female contestants!!Original series!!Finish
|-
|
|Survivor: Cagayan
|Winner
|-
| 
|The Amazing Race 33
|Finalist
|-
| 
|Love Island 2
|Finalist
|-
| 
|Big Brother 20
|Finalist
|-
| 
|Survivor: Heroes vs. Healers vs. Hustlers
|Finalist
|-
|  
|Big Brother 23
|Episode 11
|-
| 
|Love Island 3
|Episode 9
|-
| 
|Love Island 1
|Episode 7
|-
| 
|Love Island 3
|Episode 6
|-
| 
|Big Brother 23
|Episode 5
|-
| 
|Survivor 41
|Episode 4
|-
| 
|Survivor: Cagayan 
|Episode 3
|-
| 
|Big Brother 23
|Episode 2
|-
| 
|Love Island 2
|Episode 1
|}
|}

Format
USA consists of a daily challenge, winner's selection and an elimination round. For the first seven episodes, players compete as male/female pairs which change for each cycle of the game.Daily Challenge: Players compete in a main challenge in male/female teams of two. The last-place team is automatically sent to the elimination round. The winners earn $5,000 each for their bank account and the power to select a second team to compete in the elimination against the last-place team.Eliminations ("The Arena"): The last-place team from the daily challenge compete in an elimination round against the team selected by the winners of the daily challenge. The losers are eliminated while the winners remain in the game and split all the money from their opponent's bank accounts.

From episode 8, the game changed to an individual format, and elimination rounds were designated to one gender. Players compete in daily challenges individually, where the last-place player of the designated gender is automatically sent to the elimination round to compete against the same-gender player later selected by the winners. The winner remains in the game and receives all the money in their opponent's bank account while the loser is eliminated.

 TwistsBank Accounts: Each player starts the game with $1,000 in their bank account. To be eligible to compete in the Final Challenge, players must accumulate at least $5,000. They can earn money for their account by winning daily challenges or eliminations. The Algorithm: From episode two to episode seven, an algorithm assigns players a new partner of the opposite gender for the next cycle of the game. Players must be assigned a new partner they haven't previously been paired with, and cannot have the same partner twice in a row if they have already partnered with each eligible remaining player. The Algorithm also selects teams for day one of the Final Challenge.

Gameplay
Challenge gamesDown To Do the Math: Played two teams at a time, teams rappel down the side of a 22-story building, solve a series of math operations assigned to them along the way and answer once they reach the ground. If teams answer incorrectly three times, they must climb the stairs to the top of the building and rappel again. The team with the fastest time wins while the team with the slowest time is automatically sent to the Arena.
 Winners: Angela & TysonYeah Buoy: Played two teams at a time, teams must swim to a ladder, climb up and jump onto a spinning buoy. They can then take five letter tiles attached to the buoy at once, return them to shore and place them on a board to form as many words as possible, repeating this process for 20 minutes. The team with the most words formed wins while the team with the fewest words is automatically sent to the Arena.
 Winners: Justine & TysonHang On Man: Teams run across a carpark to collect 12 pieces and build a staircase to the top a container. Once built, one team member balances on a narrow plank holding a rod across their back. Like hangman, the other team member takes letter tiles from the container to a puzzle board as their guess to a hidden phrase. After each incorrect guess, they must clip a 10-pound sandbag onto the rod their partner is holding. Teams are eliminated from the challenge if the team member on the plank falls off or drops the rod. The first team to guess their phrase and transport a final sandbag back to their container wins while the first team to drop their rod or fall of the plank is automatically sent to the Arena.
 Winners: Angela & KylandFalling Off the Knowledge: Played in three heats, teams begin suspended on a ledge off the side of a building. After being asked a question with multiple answers, such as naming zodiac signs, one team at a time must give one of the possible answers. If teams answer incorrectly or with a previously given answer, their ledge opens and drops them 150 feet. The last team standing in each heat advance to the winner's round while the first team to answer incorrectly in each heat must compete in an additional loser's round. The last team standing in the winner's round wins while the first team to answer incorrectly in the loser's round is automatically sent to the Arena.
 Winners: Alyssa & KylandBarreled Treasure: Teams swim 150 yards from a barge to their buoy with a number code printed on it, memorize the code and swim another 75 yards to a ship. On the ship, they must search among one hundred barrels for two with the same code on the lid, and return the puzzle pieces inside to the barge after finding each barrel. If teams open an incorrect barrel, they must swim back to their buoy before returning to the ship to continue searching. Once they return both sets of puzzle pieces, the first team to solve the puzzle wins while the last team is automatically sent to the Arena.
 Winners: Cashay & TysonContainment: Played one team at a time. Team members swim and climb a ladder to opposite sides of a shipping container course suspended above water. They must count the amounts of four symbols printed on the first container, cross a net onto a second container then use a rope to swing to a platform at the middle of the course. Once both team members reach the platform, they must take their team's keys, return to shore, and place them in a board to release a card. Teams then multiply the number of each of the symbols they counted by its value listed on the card and add the four totals together to get their final answer.  Teams must complete the course again if they answer incorrectly or fall off before reaching the platform. The team with the fastest time wins while the team with the slowest time is automatically sent to the Arena. If multiple teams are unable to complete the challenge, the last-place team is determined by how far they progressed in the course.
 Winners: David & DesiWreck-Reational Driving: Teams begin in a car with four balls attached to the outside. Throughout the challenge, one team member must drive the car blindfolded, being directed by their partner, and try to pop their opponent's balls while avoiding having their own balls popped. Teams are eliminated from the challenge if all their balls get popped, or are unable to drive any further after wrecking their car. The last team standing wins while the first team eliminated is automatically sent to the Arena. 
 Winners: Cayla & DomenickHaving A Blast: Played one or two players at a time, players jump from a Zodiac boat into a soap-covered floating runway being pulled by a tugboat. They must then take a key from  a station at one end of the runway and plug it into a safe at the other end, repeating this process for all four keys. After inserting all four keys, players must return the flag inside the safe back to the station. During the challenge, one or two other contestants would spray water at them, and players are disqualified if they fall off the runway. The male and female players with the fastest time wins while the male player with the slowest time is automatically sent to the Arena. 
 Winners: Angela & BenCollect Four: Each player begins with a six-by-five board. Throughout the challenge, they must search the Estadio Juan Domingo Perón for their colored tokens, and can either place the tokens on their board to try and line up four tokens in a row or flip the tokens over and place them on an opponent’s board to block them. The first male and female to line up four tokens on their board wins while the first female to have their board completely blocked and be unable to line up four tokens is automatically sent to the Arena.
 Winners: Danny & DesiCode Crossing: Two players at a time begin harnessed at the end of a speeding truck. They must place pegs into slots on the side of the truck and use them to reach the front and pull a cord. Before the challenge, each player could also select six slots to already have a peg placed. There is a three-minute time limit before players time out and players are disqualified if they fall off the truck. If multiple players are unable to complete the challenge, the winning and losing players are determined by distance travelled. The male and female with the fastest time, or furthest distance, wins while the male player with the shortest distance crossed is automatically sent to the Arena.
Tokens are worth 1 point while blue, yellow, orange, red and pink tires are worth 3, 5, 7, 10 and 20 points respectively. The harder an item is to obtain, the more points it is worth. Players repeat this process for two hours, and may only carry one item at a time. The male and female with the most points at the end of two hours wins while the female player with the fewest points is automatically sent to the Arena.Winners: Domenick, Sarah & Tyson

Arena gamesKnot So Fast: Teams have 20 minutes to create as many knots as they can using a 250-foot rope within a pyramid structure. After those 20 minutes are up, teams switch positions and must untie their opponent's knots. The first team to untie their opponent's knots and place the rope inside their circle wins.
 Played by: Azah & Kyland vs. Cely & JavonnyKnowledge Is Powered: Teams pedal stationary bikes connected to a power station to illuminate six lights. After each second light is lit, 12 symbols would briefly display on a screen which teams must memorize and replicate on their board. The first team to light up all six lights and correctly replicate all three sets of symbols wins.
 Played by: Cashel & Tiffany vs. Cayla & JamesPlug and Play: One team member enters a container filled with water to release 14 submerged blocks and pass them to their partner, who stacks the blocks to build a tower. Throughout the elimination, the water slowly drains out of the container and teams are disqualified if the water drops below a marked line. The first team to build their tower wins.
 Played by: Cashay & Domenick vs. James & TashaSmash In Puzzle Out: Teams break through glass panes enclosed in a narrow tunnel to reach a set of puzzle pieces at the end. They must then retrieve the pieces, one by one, and solve the puzzle. Each pane must also be broken by a specific team member and teams are assigned a five-second penalty for each pane broken by the wrong player. The first team to solve the puzzle wins.
 Played by: David & Justine vs. Shan & XavierA Dark Turn: While tied together, teams enter a dark container to find a stack of varying sized film reels. Using their sense of touch, they must identify the order the reels are stacked in and replicate the stack outside. The first team to correctly replicate the stack wins.
 Played by: Azah & Cinco vs. Leo & SarahSpelling Eeb: Teams begin with stack of 60 tires. Each team member is asked to spell a word backwards. If they are incorrect, five tires are removed from their opponent’s stack. Afterwards, teams must transfer and restack their tires on a platform at the opposite end of the Arena, and each team member can only carry one tire at a time. The first team to restack all their tires wins.
 Played by: Derek & Shannon vs. Enzo & JustineBall & Chain: Teams must open six panels at the top of a tall wall to reveal six trivia questions. They must search among several medicine balls wrapped in chains for six with the answers on them, and place them on the wall above their respective question. The first team to correctly answer all six questions wins.
 Played by: Alyssa & Leo vs. Kyland & KyraHall Brawl: Players must run through a narrow hallway past their opponent and ring a bell. The player who rings the bell first twice wins.
 Played by: Enzo vs. LeoIn a Roll: Each player begins inside a giant steel wheel connected to a 300-foot rope with a ball at the end. They must spin the wheel to unravel the rope and pull the ball towards them. The first player to pull the ball towards their wheel twice wins.
 Played by: Cashay vs. SarahBalls In: Played across five rounds. Each round, players play both offense and defense. The offense player attempts to deposit a ball into a goal at the center of a ring while the defense player attempts to stop them by blocking them and knocking the ball out of bounds. Players then switch positions before the end of the round. The player with the most goals scored at the end of the final round wins.
 Played by: David vs. EnzoPole Wrestle: Players begin at the center of the Arena with both hands on a metal pole. The first player to wrestle the pole out of their opponent's hands twice wins. Played by: Alyssa vs. Angela

Final Challenge
The remaining contestants were flown to Patagonia for the Final Challenge, where they would race up Cerro López mountain. Players complete a series of checkpoints in male-female pairs to earn points based on their placements. However, due to uneven numbers after Ben's departure from the competition, each female player would have to complete a checkpoint individually. The male and female players with the most points at the end of the Final Challenge are declared the winners of the season. To take home the money they currently possess in their bank account, players must finish the Final Challenge. If, at any point, a teammate quits, their partner is also out and both players' bank accounts are reduced to $0.

The first pair or individual to complete each checkpoint receives 5 points each; second receives 4 points; third receives 3 points; fourth receives 2 points; fifth receives 1 point. After each checkpoint, the Algorithm determines new pairs for the next checkpoint. 
Day one
 Checkpoint #1: Teams or individuals must swim  from a barge to shore and solve a slide puzzle.
 Eliminated: Desi (Disqualified) & Enzo (Quit)
 Checkpoint #2: Teams or individuals must consume a plate of raw onion and garlic cloves. They must then proceed down a path, finding a series of math operations printed on barrels along the way, and answer once they reach the end.
 Checkpoint #3: Teams or individuals memorize ten numbers before bringing a decoding wheel their station the end of the path. There, they must sum the ten numbers to determine the orientation to place the wheel, then match the numbers to letters and determine a ten-letter word.
 Checkpoint #4 and Overnight Stage: Teams or individuals must use a wheelbarrow to transfer a pile of dirt into a designated area. An unaired aspect of the checkpoint also required teams or individuals to find a combination underneath the dirt, pile the dirt back at its original location to reach two hanging black bags and release them using the combination. For teams, one team member may sleep in a tent while their partner is completing the checkpoint; the female player competing alone is given a smaller pile of dirt to transfer. After finishing, teams or individuals spend the rest of the night in a tent.
 Eliminated: Angela (Disqualified)

Day two
 Final Leg:  The leg is worth "double points" where the first player to finish receives ten points, second receives eight points and third receives six points. As individuals, players complete a ten-mile race to the peak of Cerro López where the finish is located. Along the way, they must also solve a hexagonal puzzle and a Sudoku puzzle. The male and female players with the most points at the end are declared the winners of USA and split the unclaimed money from the $500,000 grand prize, which includes the bank account money of finalists who withdrew or were disqualified from the Final Challenge.Results Winners: Danny ($245,500) and Sarah ($254,500)Eliminated:''' Cayla, Domenick, Justine & Tyson (Quit)

Game summary

Episode progress

 Bank accounts at the end of each episode
Competition
 The contestant won the Final Challenge.
 The contestant withdrew from the Final Challenge.
 The contestant was disqualified from the Final Challenge.
 The contestant was removed from the competition for medical reasons.
 The contestant won the daily challenge and earned $5,000 for their bank account.
 The contestant was not selected for the Arena.
 The contestant won the elimination in the Arena and received their opponent's bank account money.
 The contestant lost in the Arena and was eliminated.
Notes

Team progress
For the first episode, players chose their own teams prior to the "Down to Do the Math" challenge. From episode two to episode seven, and the Final Challenge, teams were decided by the Algorithm. From episode eight, players competed as individuals.

Episodes

References

External links

Production website

Television series by Bunim/Murray Productions
2020s American game shows
2020s American reality television series
CBS original programming
2022 American television series debuts 
USA, The Challenge
American television spin-offs
Reality television spin-offs
Television shows filmed in Argentina
Television shows set in Argentina